William Carey Foster (April 1, 1936 – May 27, 2015) was an American college basketball coach who won over 500 games during a career that spanned 30 years. Foster, a native of Palatka, Florida, compiled an overall record of 532–325 in 30 seasons. He succeeded Tates Locke at Clemson University on April 9, 1975. Foster died of Parkinson's disease in Charlotte, North Carolina on May 27, 2015.

He was one of two men's basketball head coaches named Bill Foster in the Atlantic Coast Conference from 1975 to 1980. The other was at Duke University. Neither were related to each other. Nicknames were used to differentiate the two, with the Tigers coach referred to as Clem Foster and the other as Duke Foster.

Head coaching record

College

References

1936 births
2015 deaths
American men's basketball players
Basketball coaches from South Carolina
Basketball players from South Carolina
Charlotte 49ers men's basketball coaches
Clemson Tigers men's basketball coaches
College men's basketball head coaches in the United States
Neurological disease deaths in North Carolina
Deaths from Parkinson's disease
High school basketball coaches in South Carolina
Miami Hurricanes men's basketball coaches
People from Palatka, Florida
People from Hemingway, South Carolina
Shorter Hawks men's basketball coaches
The Citadel Bulldogs basketball coaches
Virginia Tech Hokies men's basketball coaches
Wingate Bulldogs men's basketball players